Río Duque is a town in the Colón province of Panama.

Sources 
World Gazetteer: Panama

Populated places in Colón Province